Muse are an English alternative rock band formed in Teignmouth, Devon by Matthew Bellamy (lead vocals, guitars, piano), Christopher Wolstenholme (bass, backing vocals) and Dominic Howard (drums, percussion). The band have released nine studio albums: Showbiz (1999), Origin of Symmetry (2001), Absolution (2003), Black Holes and Revelations (2006), The Resistance (2009), The 2nd Law (2012), Drones (2015), Simulation Theory (2018), Will of the People (2022). "Supermassive Black Hole", the first single from the band's fourth album Black Holes and Revelations, is Muse's highest charting single, peaking at #4 on the UK Singles Chart and #6 on Billboards Hot Modern Rock Tracks. The band's fourth studio album, Black Holes and Revelations, has been their highest-selling album, with over three and a half million copies sold worldwide.

Muse have been nominated twelve times at the BRIT Awards, receiving two awards; both were for "Best Live Act", in 2005 and 2007. The band received six awards at the MTV Europe Music Awards, winning both "Best Alternative Act" (in 2004 & 2006) and "Best UK & Irish Act" (in 2004 & 2007). The album Black Holes and Revelations received numerous nominations, including a Mercury Music Prize, "Best Album" from both the MTV Europe Video Awards and the NME Awards. At the Kerrang! Awards, Muse have been nominated for the "Best British Band" award five times, from 2001 to 2004, and again in 2007, but only winning it in 2001. The NME Awards have recognised Muse by awarding them the "Best Live Band" award in 2005, 2008 and 2009; the "Best British Band" award in 2007, 2010 and 2011 and the "Best New Band" award in 2000. The Q Awards have also recognised Muse as outstanding live performers; the band were nominated for the "Best Live Act" award eight times, winning it three times in 2004, 2006, and 2007, and winning "Best Act in the World Today" in 2009, 2012, and 2016. In 2010, Muse won an MTV VMA for the first time, for Best Special Effects in a Video for "Uprising", with special effects by Humble. In 2011, they received three Grammy Award nominations, of which they won "Best Rock Album" for The Resistance, and in 2013 they received a further two nominations, for "Best Rock Album" for The 2nd Law, and "Best Rock Song" for "Madness". In 2016, they won another Grammy for "Best Rock Album" for Drones. They also received the prestigious Ivor Novello Award for the first time, for International Achievement. Overall, Muse have received 69 awards from 174 nominations.

AltRock Awards
The AltRock Award is presented annually by the American radio station i99Radio. Muse have received two nominations.

|-
|align="center" rowspan="2" | 2018 || rowspan="2"| Muse  || Tour of the Year|| 
|-
|| Best Online Performance || 
|-

American Music Awards
The American Music Awards is an annual awards ceremony created by Dick Clark in 1973. Muse have received one award from one nomination.

|-
|align="center" | 2010 || Muse || Favorite Alternative Artist || 
|-

Best Art Vinyl Award
The Best Art Vinyl award has been awarded since 2005 by Art Vinyl Ltd for the best album artwork of the past year. The award is judged by public vote from a list of 50 nominations from music industry and graphic design experts. In 2009, The Resistance won the award, beating Manic Street Preachers and Fever Ray to first place. For Best Art Vinyl 2012, The 2nd Law came in second place.

|-
|align="center" | 2009 || The Resistance || rowspan="2"|Best Vinyl Art || 
|-
|align="center" | 2012 || The 2nd Law || 
|-

Billboard Music Awards
The Billboard Music Awards, sponsored by Billboard magazine, is one of several annual United States music awards shows. The BMAs honour winners based on Billboard'''s year-end music charts, which are based on Nielsen data for sales, downloads and airplay. Muse were nominated for two awards.

|-
|align="center" rowspan="2" | 2011 || rowspan="2"| Muse || Best Rock Artist || 
|-
|| Best Alternative Artist || 
|-

Brit Awards
The Brit Awards are the British Phonographic Industry's annual pop music awards. Muse have received two awards from twelve nominations.

|-
| 2004 || rowspan="4" | Muse || British Rock Act || 
|-
| rowspan="4" | 2005 || British Group || 
|-
| British Rock Act || 
|-
| British Live Act || 
|-
| Absolution || British Album of the Year || 
|-
| rowspan="3" | 2007 || rowspan="2" | Muse || British Group || 
|-
| British Live Act || 
|-
| Black Holes and Revelations || British Album of the Year || 
|-
| 2008 || rowspan="4" | Muse || British Live Act || 
|-
| 2010 || rowspan="2" | British Group || 
|-
| rowspan="2" | 2013 || 
|-
| British Live Act || 

European Festival Awards
The European Festival Awards are awarded annually, with various categories for all aspects of festivals that have taken place in Europe. Muse have received 2 awards from 2 nominations.

|-
|align="center" rowspan="2" | 2010 || Muse || Best Headliner || 
|-
| "Uprising" || Anthem of the Year || 
|-

GAFFA Awards
GAFFA Awards (Denmark)
Delivered since 1991, the GAFFA Awards are a Danish award that rewards popular music by the magazine of the same name.

!
|-
| 2003
| Muse
| Foreign Live Act
| 
| style="text-align:center;" rowspan="4"|
|-
| rowspan="3"| 2006
| Muse
| Best Foreign Band
| 
|-
| "Starlight"
| Best Foreign Song
| 
|-
| Black Holes and Revelations| Best Foreign Album
| 
|-
| 2008
| H.A.A.R.P.| Best Foreign DVD
| 
| style="text-align:center;" rowspan="5"|
|-
| rowspan="3"| 2009
| The Resistance
| Best Foreign Album
| 
|-
| "Uprising"
| Best Foreign Song
| 
|-
| rowspan="3"| Muse
| rowspan="3"| Best Foreign Band
| 
|-
| 2012
| 
|-
| 2015
| 
| style="text-align:center;" |
|-
|}

GAFFA Awards (Sweden)
Delivered since 2010, the GAFFA Awards (Swedish: GAFFA Priset) are a Swedish award that rewards popular music awarded by the magazine of the same name.

!
|-
| 2019
| Muse
| Best Foreign Band
| 
| style="text-align:center;" |
|-
|}

Grammy Awards
The Grammy Awards are an annual music awards show, presented by National Academy of Recording Arts and Sciences. Muse have received two awards from eight nominations.

|-
|align="center" rowspan="3" | 2011 ||rowspan="2" | "Resistance" || Best Rock Performance by a Duo or Group with Vocal || 
|-
| Best Rock Song || 
|-
|| The Resistance
|rowspan="2" | Best Rock Album
| 
|-
|align="center" rowspan="2" | 2013
|| The 2nd Law
| 
|-
|| "Madness"
|rowspan="2" | Best Rock Song 
| 
|-
|align="center"| 2014
|| "Panic Station"
| 
|-
|align="center"| 2016
|| Drones
|Best Rock Album
| 
|-
|align="center"| 2023
|| "Kill or be Killed" 
| Best Metal Performance
| 

Ivor Novello Awards
The Ivor Novello Awards, named after the Cardiff born entertainer Ivor Novello, are awards for songwriting and composing. They are presented annually in London by the British Academy of Songwriters, Composers and Authors (BASCA). The Ivors remain the only award ceremony in the musical calendar that is not influenced by publishers and record companies but judged and presented by the writing community.

|-
|| 2011 || Muse || International Achievement || 

Kerrang! Awards
The Kerrang! Awards are awarded annually by British music magazine Kerrang!. Muse have received four awards from eleven nominations.

|-
|align="center"| 2001 || Muse || Best British Band || 
|-
|align="center" rowspan="2" | 2002 ||rowspan="2" | Muse || Best British Live Act || 
|-
| Best British Band || 
|-
|align="center"| 2003 || Muse || Best British Band || 
|-
|align="center" rowspan="3" | 2004 || Absolution || Best Album || 
|-
|rowspan="2" | Muse || Best British Band || 
|-
| Best Live Band || 
|-
|align="center" rowspan="2"| 2006 || Muse || Best Live Act || 
|-
| "Supermassive Black Hole" || Best Single || 
|-
|align="center" rowspan="2" | 2007 ||rowspan="2" | Muse || Best Live Band || 
|-
| Best British Band || 
|-

Mercury Prize
In 2006, Muse were nominated for the Mercury Prize for their album Black Holes and Revelations.

|-
|align="center"| 2006 ||  Black Holes and Revelations || Album of the Year || 

Meteor Music Awards
The Meteor Music Awards are the national music awards of Ireland, established by mobile telecommunications company Meteor. Muse have received one award from three nominations.

|-
|align="center" rowspan="2" | 2007 || Black Holes and Revelations || Best International Album || 
|-
| Muse || Best International Band || 
|-
|align="center"| 2008 || Oxegen 2007 || Best International Live Performance || 

MTV Awards
MTV Asia Awards
The biannual MTV Asia Awards is the Asian equivalent of the Australian MTV Australia Awards. Muse have received one award.

|-
|align="center"| 2008 || Asia Tour 2007 || Bring Da House Down || 

MTV Europe Music Awards
The MTV Europe Music Awards is an annual awards ceremony established in 1994 by MTV Europe. Muse have received seven awards from eighteen nominations. They performed at the 2012 show.

|-
| rowspan="2" | 2004 || rowspan="2" | Muse || Best Alternative || 
|-
| Best UK & Ireland Act || 
|-
| rowspan="2" | 2006 || Black Holes and Revelations || Best Album || 
|-
| rowspan="13" | Muse || Best Alternative || 
|-
| rowspan="2" | 2007 || Best Headliner || 
|-
| Best UK & Ireland Act || 
|-
| 2009 || Best Alternative || 
|-
| rowspan="3" | 2010 || Best Rock || 
|-
| Best Live Act || 
|-
| Best World Stage Performance || 
|-
| rowspan="2" | 2012 || Best Rock || 
|-
| Best Live Act || 
|-
| 2015 || Best Rock || 
|-
| 2016 || Best Rock || 
|-
| rowspan="2" | 2018 || Best Rock || 
|-
| Best Live Act || 
|-
| rowspan="1" | 2019 || rowspan="2" | Muse || Best World Stage || 
|-
|2022 || Best Rock || 

MTV Video Music Awards
The MTV Video Music Awards is an annual awards ceremony established in 1984 by MTV. Muse have received one award from three nominations.

|-
|align="center" rowspan="2" | 2010 ||rowspan="2" | "Uprising" || Best Special Effects || 
|-
| Best Rock Video || 
|-
|2022 || "Won't Stand Down" || Best Rock || 

MTV Video Music Awards Japan
The MTV Video Music Awards Japan is the Japanese version of the MTV Video Music Awards, established in 2002 by MTV Japan. Muse have received three awards.

|-
|align="center" | 2010 || "Uprising" || Best Rock Video || 
|-
|algin="center" rowspan="2"| 2013 ||rowspan="2" | "Follow Me" || Video of the Year || 
|-
| Best Rock Video || 
|-

mtvU Woodie Awards
The mtvU Woodie Awards are awarded annually by American music video network mtvU. Muse have received one award from three nominations.

|-
|align="center" rowspan="2" | 2005 ||rowspan="2" | Muse || Best Live Woodie || 
|-
| Best International Woodie || 
|-
|align="center"| 2007 || Muse || Best Performing Woodie || 

Music Video Production Awards
The MVPA Awards are annually presented by a Los Angeles-based music trade organization to honor the year's best music videos.

|-
| 2005
| "Hysteria"
| Best Special Effects 
| 
|-
| rowspan="3" | 2007
| rowspan="3" | "Knights of Cydonia"
| Best Director of a Band 
| 
|-
| Best Cinematography
| 
|-
| Best Hair 
| 
|-
| rowspan="3" | 2008
| rowspan="3" | "Invincible"
| Best Computer Effects 
| 
|-
| Best Animated Video 
| 
|-
| Best Special Effects 
| 
|-
| 2013
| "Madness"
| Best Editing 
| 

NME Awards
The NME Awards are an annual music awards show, founded by the music magazine NME. Muse have received 19 awards from 49 nominations.

|-
|align="center"| 2000 || Muse || Best New Band || 
|-
|align="center" rowspan="2" | 2002 || Origin of Symmetry || Best Album || 
|-
| Muse || Best Live Act || 
|-
|align="center"| 2005 || Muse || Best Live Band || 
|-
|align="center" rowspan="5" | 2007 || "Supermassive Black Hole" || Best Track || 
|-
| Black Holes and Revelations || Best Album || 
|-
|rowspan="2" | Muse || Best Live Band || 
|-
| Best British Band || 
|-
|align="left" rowspan="2" | Matthew Bellamy || align="left" rowspan="2" | Sexiest Male || 
|-
|align="center" rowspan="4" | 2008 || 
|-
| Wembley Stadium 2007 || Best Live Event || 
|-
|rowspan="2" | Muse || Best Live Band || 
|-
| Best British Band || 
|-
|align="center" rowspan="5" | 2009 ||rowspan="2" | Muse || Best British Band || 
|-
| Best Live Band || 
|-
|align="left" rowspan="2" | HAARP || Best DVD || 
|-
| Best Album Artwork || 
|-
| Matthew Bellamy || Sexiest Male || 
|-
|align="center" rowspan="12" | 2010 || align="left" rowspan="2" | Muse || Best British Band || 
|-
| Best Live Band || 
|-
|align="left" rowspan="2" | The Resistance || Best Album || 
|-
| Best Album Artwork || 
|-
| muse.mu and twitter.com/muse || Best Band Blog || 
|-
| muse.mu || Best Website || 
|-
| A Seaside Rendezvous || Best Live Event || 
|-
| "Plug In Baby" || Best Guitar Riff || 
|-
|align="left" rowspan="3" | Matthew Bellamy || Worst Dressed || 
|-
| Hero of the Year || 
|-
|align="left" rowspan="2" | Hottest Male || 
|-
| Dominic Howard || 
|-
|align="center" rowspan="5" | 2011 || align="left" rowspan="2" | Muse || Best British Band || 
|-
| Best Live Band || 
|-
|align="left" rowspan="2" | Matthew Bellamy || Hero of the Year || 
|-
|align="left" rowspan="2" | Hottest Male || 
|-
| Dominic Howard || 
|-
|align="center" rowspan="7" | 2012 ||align="left" rowspan="4" | Muse || Best British Band || 
|-
| Best Live Band || 
|-
| Most Dedicated Fans || 
|-
| Worst Band || 
|-
|align="left" rowspan="2" | Matthew Bellamy || Hero of the Year || 
|-
|align="left" rowspan="2" | Hottest Male || 
|-
| Dominic Howard || 
|-
|align="center" rowspan="2" | 2013 || rowspan="2"| Muse || Best Fan Community || 
|-
| Best Twitter ||  
|-
|align="center" rowspan="2" | 2014 || rowspan="2"| Muse || Worst Band || 
|-
| Best Fan Community || 
|-
|align="center" rowspan="1" | 2015 || rowspan="1"| Muse || Best Fan Community || 
|-
|align="center"| 2018 || Muse || Best Festival Headliner || 
|-
|align="center"| 2020 || Muse || Best Reissue || 
|-

NRJ Music Awards
The NRJ Music Awards, created in 2000 by the radio station NRJ in partnership with the television network TF1, takes place every year in mid-January at Cannes. They give out awards to popular musicians in different categories. Muse have received one award from two nomination.

|-
|align="center" | 2011 || Muse || International Group/Duo of the Year || 
|-
|align="center" | 2018 || Muse || NRJ Award of Honor || 
|-

Silver Clef Awards
The Silver Clef Award is an annual UK music awards lunch which has been running since 1976. Muse received one award from one nomination.

|-
|align="center" | 2010 || Muse || Nordorff Robbins O2 Silver Clef Award || 
|-

Peoples Choice Awards
The People's Choice Awards is an annual awards ceremony from CBS to honor pop culture. Muse received one nomination

|-
|align="center" | 2014 || Muse || Favorite Alternative Band || 
|-

Q Awards
The Q Awards are the UK's annual music awards run by music magazine Q. Muse have received seven awards from 27 nominations.

|-
|align="center" rowspan="2" | 2000 || Showbiz || Best Album || 
|-
| Muse || Best New Act || 
|-
|align="center" rowspan="2" | 2001 || Origin of Symmetry || Best Album || 
|-
| Muse || Best Live Act || 
|-
|align="center"| 2002 || Muse || Best Live Act || 
|-
|align="center" rowspan="3" | 2003 ||rowspan="2" | "Time Is Running Out" || Best Single || 
|-
| Best Video || 
|-
| Muse || Innovation in Sound || 
|-
|align="center" rowspan="2" | 2004 ||rowspan="2" | Muse || Best Live Act || 
|-
| Best Act in the World Today || 
|-
|align="center" rowspan="3" | 2006 ||rowspan="2" | Muse || Best Live Act || 
|-
| Best Act in the World Today || 
|-
| Black Holes and Revelations || Best Album || 
|-
|align="center" rowspan="3" | 2007 || "Knights of Cydonia" || Best Track || 
|-
|rowspan="2" | Muse || Best Live Act || 
|-
| Best Act in the World Today || 
|-
|align="center"| 2008 || Muse || Best Act in the World Today || 
|-
|align="center" rowspan="2" | 2009 || Muse || Best Act in the World Today || 
|-
| "Uprising" || Best Track || 
|-
|align="center" rowspan="2" | 2010 ||rowspan="2"| Muse || Best Act in the World Today || 
|-
| Best Live Act || 
|-
|align="center"|2012||Muse||Best Act in the World Today||
|-
|align="center"|2013||Muse|| Best Live Act || 
|-
|align="center" rowspan="2"|2015||Muse|| Best Act in the World Today || 
|-
| "Psycho" || Best Video || 
|-
|align="center" rowspan="2"|2016|| rowspan="2"|Muse|| Best Act in the World Today || 
|-
| Best Live Act || 

UK Festival Awards
The UK Festival Awards are awarded annually, with various categories for all aspects of festivals that have taken place in the UK, and one category for European festivals. Muse have received 1 award from 3 nominations.

|-
|align="center"| 2008 || Muse || Best Headline Act || 
|-
|align="center" rowspan="2" | 2010 || Glastonbury and T in the Park || Best Headline Performance || 
|-
| "Uprising" || Anthem of the Year || 
|-

Ticketmaster Touring Milestone Award
An annual honor for musicians who headlined the biggest tours, rocked the largest stage and reached the most fans around the world. To qualify for a Ticketmaster Touring Milestone Award (TTMA), an artist must have sold at least one million tickets globally for a tour. Muse have received 1 award from 1 nominations.

|-
|align="center"| 2019 || The Simulation Theory World Tour || Touring Milestone Award || 
|-

 ZD Awards  Zvukovaya Dorozhka'''  ("sound track") is Russia's oldest hit parade in field of popular music. Since 2003 it is presented in a ceremony in concert halls. It's considered one of the major Russian music awards.

!
|-
| rowspan="2"|2015
| Themselves
| Best Foreign Act
| 
| style="text-align:center;" rowspan="2"|
|-
| Drones World Tour (live at Park Live Festival'')
| Tour of the Year
| 
|-
|}

References

External links
Muse official website
ART VINYL official website

Awards
Lists of awards received by British musician
Lists of awards received by musical group